Storm in a Water Glass (German: Sturm im Wasserglas) is a 1931 Austrian-German comedy film directed by Georg Jacoby and starring Hansi Niese, Renate Müller and Paul Otto. The film is known by the alternative title The Flower Woman of Lindenau (Die Blumenfrau von Lindenau). It is notable, in part, for the small role played by Hedy Lamarr in her second film. The film's art direction was by Hans Jacoby.

It premiered in Vienna on 13 March 1931, coinciding with the opening of the Sascha-Filmpalast cinema. The film was remade in 1960.

Plot
An ambitious town councillor feels confident he will be elected the next mayor, but a dispute over a mongrel dog owned by a local flower seller rapidly turns into a scandal which threatens his political career.

Cast
Hansi Niese as Frau Vogel - flower woman 
Renate Müller as Viktoria Thoss 
Paul Otto as Dr. Thoss - her husband 
Harald Paulsen as Burdach - editor 
Herbert Hübner as Quilling - newspaper publisher 
Grete Maren as Lisa - his wife 
Oscar Sabo as Pfaffenzeller - Magistrates' servant
Otto Treßleras Gerichtsvorsitzender 
Franz Schafheitlin as Prosecutor
Hedy Lamarr as Secretary 
Eugen Guenther as assessor #1 
Karl Kneidinger as assessor #2
Alfred Neugebauer as a kid

References

External links

1931 films
Films of the Weimar Republic
1931 comedy films
German comedy films
Austrian comedy films
1930s German-language films
Films directed by Georg Jacoby
German films based on plays
German black-and-white films
1930s German films